"Word Up!" is a funk and R&B song originally recorded by American funk band Cameo in 1986. It was released as the first single from their twelfth album, Word Up! (1986). The song was written by band members Larry Blackmon and Tomi Jenkins. Its frequent airing on American dance, R&B, and contemporary hit radio, as well as its MTV music video (in which LeVar Burton appears as a police detective trying to arrest the band), helped the single become the band's best known hit.

Release and reception
"Word Up!" was Cameo's first US Top 40 hit, peaking at number six on the Billboard Hot 100 and spending three weeks at number one on the Billboard R&B chart and one week at number one on the Billboard Hot Dance Singles chart.

In the United Kingdom, "Word Up" spent ten weeks in the top 40 of the UK Singles Chart, peaking at number three on September 21, 1986 – for the week ending date September 27, 1986.

Besides being a commercial success, the track also earned critical acclaim from several publications. "Word Up!" won Cameo the Soul Train Music Award for Best R&B/Soul Single as well as the NME Award for Best Dance Record. Like the band's previous single "Single Life", "Word Up!" features a reference to the opening notes of Ennio Morricone's theme to The Good, the Bad and the Ugly.

"Word Up" was a colloquialism, popular in New York City and other US urban areas, that acted as an affirmation of what was said — a kind of a more-hip "You Bet."

Blackmon said of the song:
It just sounded good, and it was before its time. You can play 'Word Up' anyplace anywhere, and someone is going to be grooving and bobbing their head. Our sound was unique, as well. I haven’t heard another one like it, and we probably won’t hear another one like it in the future. It was that significant for us."

Impact and legacy
Time Out listed the song number 54 in their The 100 best party songs list in 2018.

Word Up! has been covered numerous times by other artists. It is an easy song to sing, being riff-based and having a simple vocal melody.

Charts

Weekly charts

Year-end charts

Gun version

In the 1990s, "Word Up!" was first covered by Scottish hard rock band Gun, whose version carried a harder, more rock-oriented sound, including a guitar solo. Taken from their album Swagger, it was released on July 1, 1994, and peaked number eight on the UK Singles Chart. Two versions of the CD single were released in the UK, each carrying different cover art and different tracks.

Charts

Mel B version

"Word Up!" was later covered by British singer Mel B of the Spice Girls (known as Melanie G at that time, and her only single under that name) from the film soundtrack Austin Powers: The Spy Who Shagged Me. It was released on June 28, 1999, and peaked at number 13 on the UK Singles Chart. The single was also included on the Japanese edition of her album Hot. Static sings uncredited background vocals on the track. Brown's bandmate Emma Bunton sings background vocals on the B-side, "Sophisticated Lady", with an uncredited rap by Dexter.

Format and track listing
Digital download EP
"Word Up" (Radio Edit) – 3:23
"Sophisticated Lady" – 2:44  
"Word Up" (Tim's Dance Mix) – 5:32

Charts

Korn version

"Word Up!" by American nu metal band Korn is a cover of the Cameo song. Its musical arrangements are similar to that of the cover version by Gun, except it is played in a lower sounding 7 string guitar tuning instead of the standard E. "Word Up!" was the first track featured on Korn's 2004 retrospective album, Greatest Hits, Volume 1, and was one of two new tracks along with Pink Floyd's "Another Brick in the Wall" that was exclusive to the album (the "Word Up!" CD single also featured a live performance of the latter).

Background and release 
It was released as the album's first single in July 2004, and received heavy airplay on alternative radio at its time of release, peaking in the top 20 of both Billboard charts, whilst making a respectable impression on the mainstream charts of other countries, including Australia (where it debuted at number 28), and Germany (number 46). It is the only Korn single to be sent out to Top 40 radio stations, notably receiving airplay on New York City's Z-100, the largest Top 40 station in the US. Lead singer Jonathan Davis has said of the band's decision to include the song on their greatest hits, "We've been doing 'Word Up!' for years as a sound-check song—not the full version, just messing around with the riff."

Charts

Jan Delay version

In 2007 German singer Jan Delay recorded a mashup of the music from "Word Up!" with the lyrics of Das Bo's "Türlich, Türlich (Sicher, Dicker)". The new song was titled "Türlich Türlich (Word Up)" and was a hit in German-speaking countries.

Charts

Little Mix version

British girl group Little Mix released a cover version of the song for Sport Relief 2014, through Syco Music and Columbia Records. It was released digitally on March 16, 2014, followed by a physical release the following day, which was only available to purchase from Sainsbury's supermarkets. 

"Word Up" peaked at number six on the UK Singles Chart and reached the top twenty in Ireland. The song also charted in Australia, Austria, Denmark, France, Czech Republic, and Japan. It has been certified gold in Brazil. The single is also included on the expanded edition of the group's second studio album Salute (2013).

Background and release 
Little Mix first announced the single on January 16, 2014, through their official Twitter. The song was first played on BBC Radio 1 on January 20, 2014, during Nick Grimshaw's Breakfast show.

The cover art of the single was revealed on January 24, 2014.

Critical reception 
The song received mostly positive reviews with Popjustice ranking it as third for the best version of the song and third for the best Sport Relief single and gave the song 7 out of 10 stars. Kevin Kevinpod of DirectLyrics said that "[Little Mix's] harmonies are spot-on, and the whole record is pure fire." and that the song is a chance of the band getting a number one hit. Its production was also likened to Janet Jackson's single "Black Cat."

Music video 
The shooting for the music video started in early February 2014. The band posted an exclusive picture from the video on February 25, 2014. The video was first shown on the Chart Show TV on February 28, 2014 and was posted on Vevo on March 3, 2014. It features celebrity cameos from Nick Grimshaw, Louie Spence, Louis Smith, Arlene Phillips, Melanie C and Chris Barrie.

The video starts off with the band in a changing room of a gym. As they walk out of the changing room, Jade tries to pick up a barbell pretending that she cannot lift it but then she lifts it up and walks away carrying it. Perrie then walks along four women who are working out while Jade is on a stationary bicycle among three other women, following the instructions of a trainer. With the bicycle, Jade starts going forward with the rest following her at the back.

The scene then switches to a court with the band exercising and dancing the same time along with other people while singing the chorus of the song. Afterwards, Leigh-Anne is stood in front of some athletes with one using her as a barbell at the end of her part. Jesy continues with her part while dancing in front of two men working out on treadmills and fall off them after some time. During the chorus, the scene changes again to the court with the owner (Barrie, who had previously played leisure centre manager Gordon Brittas in BBC sitcom The Brittas Empire) of the gym seeing the girls and the rest dancing and runs upset out of his office. As he is going down to the court, he sees the athletes in the swimming pool shaping out the title of the song. When he reaches the court, he starts dancing with them.

Track listings 
Digital download
"Word Up!" – 3:26

Digital remixes
"Word Up!" (The Alias Radio Edit) – 3:33
"Word Up!" (Extended Mix) – 4:59
"Word Up!" (Instrumental) – 3:05

CD single
"Word Up!" – 3:26
"Word Up!" (The Alias Radio Edit) – 3:33
"Word Up!" (Extended Mix) – 4:59
"Word Up!" (Instrumental) – 3:05

Charts

Certifications

Release history

References

Bibliography
 

1986 songs
1986 singles
1994 singles
1999 singles
2004 singles
2014 singles
Cameo (band) songs
Gun (band) songs
Korn songs
Mel B songs
Little Mix songs
Songs written by Larry Blackmon
Song recordings produced by Timbaland
Number-one singles in New Zealand
Mercury Records singles
Funk songs